"College" is the fifth episode of the first season of the HBO television drama series The Sopranos, and originally aired on February 7, 1999. It was written by co-producer James Manos Jr. and series creator/executive producer David Chase and directed by Allen Coulter. The episode was ranked number 2 on TV Guide's 2009 list of "100 Greatest Episodes of All-Time".

Cast
 James Gandolfini as Tony Soprano
 Lorraine Bracco as Dr. Jennifer Melfi
 Edie Falco as Carmela Soprano
 Michael Imperioli as Christopher Moltisanti
 Dominic Chianese as Corrado Soprano Jr. *
 Vincent Pastore as Pussy Bonpensiero *
 Steven Van Zandt as Silvio Dante *
 Tony Sirico as Paulie Gualtieri *
 Robert Iler as Anthony Soprano Jr.
 Jamie-Lynn Sigler as Meadow Soprano
 Nancy Marchand as Livia Soprano *

* = credit only

Guest cast
 Paul Schulze as Father Phil
 Tony Ray Rossi as Fabian "Febby" Petrulio, aka Fred Peters
 Oksana Lada as Irina Peltsin
 Lisa Arning as Peters' Wife
 Ross Gibby as Bartender
 Mark Kamine as Admissions Dean
 Michael Manetta as Gas Station Attendant
 Keith Nobbs as Bowdoin Student
 Luke Reilly as Lon Le Doyene
 Sarah Thompson as Lucinda
 Olivia Brynn Zaro as Peters' Daughter

Synopsis
Tony takes Meadow on a trip to Maine to visit three colleges she is considering. During the drive, Tony is taken aback when she asks if he is "in the Mafia", and he denies it. When Meadow is skeptical, he admits that a portion of his income is from illegal gambling and other activities. Meadow admits that she took speed to study for her SATs but, when Tony reacts angrily, will not say where she got it. Both seem relieved by this mutual honesty on difficult topics.

At a gas station, Tony thinks he spots Fabian "Febby" Petrulio, a former member of the DiMeo family who entered witness protection after turning state's evidence. Tony gets Christopher to run the plate number from his car, and finds that he now goes by the alias "Fred Peters". Tony resolves to locate and execute Petrulio while continuing his trip with Meadow. He leaves her with some students she has met and confirms Petrulio's identity when, in the office of his travel business, he sees a carved bust—a hobby of his when he was in the DiMeo family. Petrulio, who feels someone is watching him, finds the motel where Tony and Meadow are staying and aims his handgun at Tony, who suspects nothing; the presence of two other guests prevents him from taking the shot. The next morning, Tony drops off Meadow for an interview. He finds Petrulio at his office and garrotes him. Later, during a drive to another college, Meadow asks Tony about the mud on his shoes and a cut on his hand. She can tell he is not answering honestly, and after a time asks no more questions.

While Tony and Meadow are away, and with A.J. sleeping over at a friend's house, Father Phil Intintola drops by to enjoy Carmela's cooking and wine. Dr. Melfi phones to reschedule Tony's appointment; Carmela, discovering that Tony's therapist is a woman, assumes that he is sleeping with her. During confession, Carmela tells Father Phil about her fears for her family and her soul, and he administers communion. She sips the wine; he drains the cup. They fall asleep together on the sofa; half-waking, they are about to kiss, but Father Phil suddenly desists and walks swaying to the toilet, where he retches. He spends the night on the sofa. In the morning, Carmela firmly says, "We didn't do anything." Tony and Meadow return that day. Carmela tells Tony that Father Phil stayed the night. She counters his sarcastic comments by telling him that Melfi called.

Deceased
Fabian "Febby" Petrulio: garroted by Tony Soprano while on Tony's college trip with his daughter, Meadow, for being an FBI informant.

Title reference
 The title refers to the fact that the entire episode revolves around Tony taking Meadow on a tour of colleges in Maine.
 Throughout the series, "college" is routinely used as slang for incarceration: Fabian "Febby" Petrulio's testimony resulted in the incarceration of several Soprano family associates.

Production
 Series creator David Chase has stated that when HBO first read the script, they objected to Tony's murder of Febby. Executives said that Chase had done so well in building Tony up as a sympathetic character that they believed if Tony committed such a cold-blooded killing, fans would turn on him and the show would lose its protagonist. Chase said that he believed fans would turn on Tony if the character didn't commit murder because the omission would make him appear weak. Eventually, Chase won the decision and the episode has become a fan favorite.
 Chase named this as his favorite episode because of its self-contained nature.
 The college locations and the Maine scenes in "College" were actually filmed in rural New Jersey. The college exteriors are located at Drew University in Madison, New Jersey.
 This is the first episode where Father Phil is played by Paul Schulze. He was originally portrayed by Michael Santoro in the pilot.

Reception
The episode was rated as the best of the series by Time magazine, and was ranked #2 on TV Guides list of "Top 100 Episodes of All Time".

Emily St. James retrospectively wrote that "the genius of the episode is that the storyline blends almost every aspect of the show's world so completely that it feels like a natural thing we're watching, not really a story being told." St. James also praised the cinematography (such as cross-cutting and point-of-view shots) as "very effective at putting us in the headspace of both Febby and Tony as they slowly stalk each other", and lauded the episode as "a strangely funny, incredibly tense meditation on what it means to choose the easy path every single time." Alan Sepinwall praised Chase's use of "only two stories so he could let them both play out in exhaustive, powerful detail", and wrote that the shot of Tony "staring wistfully up at a group of flying ducks, again standing in for the feelings of family and peace that seem to remain forever beyond his grasp – is ... stunning."

Other cultural references
When Tony asks if Meadow's friends think he is cool because of having seen The Godfather, she replies that most people she knew were bigger fans of Casino and begins discussing Sharon Stone's performance in the film before being cut off.
The carved bust in Petrulio's office is of Ronald Reagan.
Father Phil tells Carmela at some point: "If you take everything Jesus has ever said, added up, it only amounts to two hours of talk" to which Carmela replies "I heard the same thing about the Beatles except it was if you add up all their songs it only comes to ten hours".
Father Phil and Carmela discuss Martin Scorsese's film The Last Temptation of Christ (and specifically, Willem Dafoe's performance as Jesus). Father Phil mentions that Robert De Niro was originally supposed to play the part, to which Carmela replies that it would have been a "completely different film". Carmela later mentions to Father Phil that she has The Remains of the Day with Emma Thompson.

Music
 The song played when Christopher plays pool in the back room of the Bada Bing when Tony calls him the first time is "Eye on You" by Rocket from the Crypt.
 The song played when Tony and Meadow have dinner and discuss how Tony came to be involved in the mob and during the end credits is "Gold Leaves" by Michael Hoppé.
 The song played when Tony leaves Meadow with two girls from Colby College is "Maine Two-Step" by The Basin Brothers.
 The song playing in the bar when Fabian enters to ask whether anyone has been asking about him is "Cadence to Arms", a version of "Scotland the Brave" by the Dropkick Murphys.

Filming locations 
In order of first appearance:

 Drew University in Madison, New Jersey
 Orangetown, New York
 Oakland, New Jersey
 Long Island City, Queens
 Tappan, New York
 Reformed Church of Tappan in Tappan, New York
 Rutherford, New Jersey
 Orangeburg, New York
 North Caldwell, New Jersey

Awards
James Manos Jr. and David Chase won a Primetime Emmy Award for Outstanding Writing for a Drama Series for their work on this episode. Edie Falco received her first Primetime Emmy Award nomination and win for Outstanding Lead Actress in a Drama Series for her performance as Carmela in this episode.

References

External links
 "College"  at HBO
 

The Sopranos (season 1) episodes
1999 American television episodes
Emmy Award-winning episodes
Television episodes directed by Allen Coulter
Television episodes set in Maine
Television episodes written by David Chase